This is a list of the 24 members of the European Parliament for the Czech Republic in the 2004 to 2009 session.

List

Party representation

Notes 

2004
List
Czech Republic